Paul Myer Rebsamen (January 29, 1905 – March 13, 1947) was a professional football player from Fort Smith, Arkansas who played one season in the National Football League. He attended Centenary College of Louisiana and made his NFL debut in 1927 with the Pottsville Maroons.

References

1905 births
1947 deaths
Players of American football from Arkansas
American football centers
Centenary Gentlemen football players
Pottsville Maroons players
Sportspeople from Fort Smith, Arkansas